The Federation Cup (also known as Hero Federation Cup for sponsorship reasons) was an annual knockout football competition in Indian football which started in 1977. From its inception, until I-League was started in 1997 (then called NFL), it was the most prestigious national level club football tournament in India. Until 2017, it was the most important club tournament after the I-League, to which it was the national football cup. Winner of the Federation Cup was given direct entry in the AFC Cup.

The holders of the 2017 Federation Cup were Bengaluru who beat Mohun Bagan 2–0 in the 2017 final held in Cuttack, Odisha.

All India Football Federation announced that Federation Cup will be put on hold to avoid scheduling conflict with Indian Super League and I-League, but after Asian Football Confederation mandated that a club must play at least 18 matches in the season, AIFF decided to revive the tournament under new format.

Venues
Matches during the Federation Cup were usually held at neutral venues around India. The final was also held in a neutral venue. From 2015–16 season matches were played as two legged (home and away) knockout format.

Results

Past winners and runners-up

a.e.t.: after extra time
pen.: score in penalty shootout

Teams reaching final

* : shared
# :There were two federation cups in 1996

Overall top goalscorers

(Note. * Includes 7 goals scored in Eastern Zone Qualifiers at Sibsagar – 1990 Federation Cup)

See also
IFA Shield
Durand Cup
Rovers Cup
List of football clubs in India

References

 
Football cup competitions in India
National association football cups
Recurring sporting events established in 1977
1977 establishments in India
2017 disestablishments in India
Defunct football competitions in India